Wanderers Oval, nicknamed Magic Park, is a multi-use sportsground in Newcastle, Australia. It is mainly used for soccer and is the home ground for the Broadmeadow Magic. The venue is also occasionally used by Newcastle Jets, and the club's women's and youth teams. It was one of 11 training sites for the 2015 AFC Asian Cup. In 2014, it hosted the first televised match of the FFA Cup.

References

External links
Soccerway page
Austadium page

Soccer venues in New South Wales
Sports venues in New South Wales
Sport in Newcastle, New South Wales
A-League Women stadiums